Virginie Girod (born 22 September 1983) is a French historian, and specialist chronicler of the history of women and sexuality.

Biography 
Virginie Girod was born in Rillieux-la-Pape, in Lyon, on 22 September 1983.

She had begin studying at Jean Moulin University Lyon 3 and Paris-Sorbonne University.

She supported a thesis of 3rd cycle in 2011 conducted by called Yann Le Bohec and Giles Sauron « L’érotisme féminin à Rome, dans le Latium et en Campanie, sous les Julio-Claudiens et les Flaviens : recherches d’histoire sociale ».

She teaches Roman history then Université populaire de Caen, founded by Michel Onfray, from 2014 to 2016. Since 2018, she started teaching studies in Ancient Roman History in Paris Diderot University.

She has collaborated in numerous magazines such as Lire, Le Point, Civilisations, and Historia.

Bibliography 

 
 
 ,.
 Une matrice : la cour romaine du Haut-Empire à l'Antiquité tardive, dans Histoire mondiale des cours de l'Antiquité à nos jours, sous la direction de Victor Battaggion et de Thierry Sarmant, Paris, Perrin, 2019. Prix Michelet 2019
 
 Liane de Pougy, Mémoires d'une grande horizontale. Mes cahiers bleus, Préface de Virginie Girod, Paris, Nouveau monde, 2021

References 

French columnists
French women columnists
French women historians
21st-century French historians
1983 births
Living people